Karori Cemetery is New Zealand's second largest cemetery, located in the Wellington suburb of Karori.

History

Karori Cemetery opened in 1891 to address overcrowding at Bolton Street Cemetery.

In 1909, it received New Zealand's first crematorium, which is still in use and is Australasia's oldest.

Karori Cemetery reached capacity during the 1950s, and Makara Cemetery became Wellington's main burial ground. Burials at Karori happen only in pre-purchased family plots, in children's plots, and in pre-purchased ash plots.

The Karori Crematorium and Chapel are listed (Class I) with the New Zealand Historic Places Trust.

Description
The cemetery covers almost  and has seen more than 83,000 burials.

War graves
The cemetery contains separate World War I and World War II services sections.  Buried here are 268 Commonwealth service personnel of World War I – including most deaths from the first New Zealand Expeditionary Force Reinforcement Camp and others at Trentham, and the Upper Hutt Remount Depot – and 123 of the World War II, besides a Norwegian and a French war casualty.

The Commonwealth War Graves Commission (CWGC) also erected a plaque commemorating 15 New Zealand service personnel of World War II who were cremated at Karori Crematorium and their ashes scattered. It is set into the Services Columbarium Wall in the Services section.

In addition, the CWGC erected the Wellington Provincial Memorial, in the form of a marble arch connecting the two Services sections, inscribed with the names of service personnel from Wellington Province who died serving in the World Wars but have no known grave.

Burials

 Lily May Kirk Atkinson (1866–1921), popular orator, suffragist and temperance worker – president of New Zealand Women's Christian Union 1901–1906; president of New Zealand Society for the Protection of Women and Children 1903–1911
 Suzanne Aubert the saint founder of the Daughters of Our Lady of  Compassion (later translated to the motherhouse of the religious institute
 Albert Henry Baskerville (1883–1908), Organiser of the famous All Golds tour to Great Britain and Australia
 William Thomas Beck (1865–1947), New Zealand Army officer and one of the first New Zealanders to land on Gallipoli on 25 April 1915
 Euphemia Cunningham (1882–1989), World War I munitions worker and recipient of the Medal of the Order of the British Empire in 1918
 William Cunningham (1883–1959), senior officer in the New Zealand Military Forces and lawyer
 John Duthie (1841–1915), businessman and politician, including Mayor of Wellington (1889–1890)
 Peter Fraser (1884–1950), Prime Minister (with memorial)
 John Hosking (1854–1928), judge of the Supreme Court
 Joseph Kinsey (1852–1936), businessman, collector, and philanthropist from Christchurch
 Cybele Ethel Kirk (1870–1957), educator, suffragist and temperance worker
 Harry McNish (1874–1930), member of Sir Ernest Shackleton's 1914 antarctic expedition. He modified the small boat, James Caird, allowing to fetch help for the rest of the crew
 Charles Morison (1861–1920), New Zealand barrister
 Thomas Orde-Lees (1877–1958), member of the 1914 Trans-Antarctic Expedition
 Elizabeth Pinfold (1859–1927), recipient of the Belgian Queen Elisabeth Medal
 Mary Player ( 1857–1924), servant, midwife, welfare worker, feminist and social reformer
 Randolph Ridling (1888–1975), recipient of the Albert Medal for Lifesaving

References

External links

 Wellington cemeteries search

Tourist attractions in Wellington City
Cemeteries in Wellington City
1891 establishments in New Zealand